Panasonic Lumix DMC-XS1 is a digital camera by Panasonic Lumix. The highest-resolution pictures it records is 16.1 megapixels, through its 24mm lens.

Property
5X wide angle optically stabilized zoom
13 in-camera creative effects
3HD video capture

References

External links
DMC-XS1K on shop.panasonic.com
DMC-XS1R on shop.panasonic.com
DMC-XS1W on shop.panasonic.com
Panasonic Lumix DMC-XS1 Review

Point-and-shoot cameras
XS1